The 1935–36 season was the 39th in the history of the Western Football League.

The Division One champions for the third time in their history were Bristol Rovers Reserves. The winners of Division Two were Swindon Town Reserves for the second consecutive season. There was again no promotion or relegation between the two divisions this season.

Division One
After Exeter City Reserves left the league, Division One was reduced from seven to six clubs, with no new clubs joining.

Division Two
Division Two remained at eighteen clubs after Bristol St George left and one new club joined:

Poole Town, rejoining after leaving the league in 1934.

References

1935-36
4